Krikščiūnas is a Lithuanian surname. Notable people with the surname include: 

 Jonas Krikščiūnas (1880–1967), Lithuanian poet
 Romualdas Krikščiūnas (1930–2010), Lithuanian bishop

Lithuanian-language surnames